This is the list of people who were born, grew up or lived in Gujranwala city and Gujranwala District. The list is ordered by the professions of these people.

Activists, lawyers and politicians 
Chaudhary Muhammad Azam Cheema (Late) Ex- Member Provincial Assembly
Chaudhary Muhammad Nasir Cheema Ex- Member Provincial Assembly
Chaudhary Jamal Nasir Cheema Vice Chairperson Punjab Social Protection Authority - Provincial Minister
Chaudhary Tanveer Azam Cheema President Agriculture wing Punjab - Pakistan Muslim League (Q)
Hamid Nasir Chattha ex- Federal Minister
Iftikhar Ahmad Cheema
Muhammad Rafiq Tarar ex-President of Pakistan
Imtiaz Safdar Warriach
Bashir Maan
Bhupinder Singh Mann
Usman Ibrahim
Muhammad Iqbal Gujjar
Akram Zaki
Chaudry Tussadiq Masud Khan
Jagdish Tytler
Makhan Singh
Parmeshwar Narayan Haksar
Khizr and Ghazala Khan
Khurram Dastgir Khan ex- Minister of Commerce,ex Minister of Defence, Minister of Power
Ghulam Dastgir Khan ex- Federal Minister
Muhammad Aslam Butt ex- Mayor
Engineer Muhammad Ashraf Butt Ex- Member Provincial Assembly

Actors
Munawar Zarif, actor and comedian
Sohail Ahmed, comedian
Saba Qamar, actress
Arun Kumar Ahuja, Indian actor and producer
Atif Aslam, Pakistani actor and Singer
Babu Baral, Pakistani stage actor and comedian
Amanullah (comedian), Pakistani Punjabi theatre performer, comedian and TV artist
Murtaza Hassan, Pakistani comedian and actor

Religious personalities 
Harbhajan Singh Khalsa
Syed Faiz-ul Hassan Shah
 Acharya Vijayanandsuri
 H. W. L. Poonja
Muhammad Raza Saqib Mustafai

Literature

 Ahmad Bashir
 Altaf Gauhar
 Amrita Pritam
 Giani Dhanwant Singh Sital
 Kripa Sagar
 Mahboob Alam
 Meeraji
 Nadeem Aslam
 Noon Meem Rashid
 Qadaryar
 Shaista Nuzhat
 Maulana Zafar Ali Khan
 Dr. Younis Butt

Military 
 Qamar Javed Bajwa, Ex Chief of Army Staff.
 Nassar Ikram
 Ahsan Malik
 Hari Singh Nalwa
 Imtiaz Ahmed
 Jind Kaur
 Maharaja Ranjit Singh
 Mahan Singh Mirpuri
 Mitty Masud
 Prem Kaur

Musicians 
 Atif Aslam
 Imran Khan, singer
 Roshan, Indian music director
 Yashpaul
 Humera Arshad

Scholars, scientists and teachers 
 Basheer Hussain Najafi
 Parvez Butt
 Qaiser Mushtaq
 Rama Tirtha
 Vivienne Stacey

Sportsperson 
 Imran Nazir
 Saad Bin Zafar
 Goga Pahalwan
 Harmik Singh
 Khalid Hamid
 Mohammad Akhtar
 Muhammad Inam
 Nida Dar
 Hasan Ali
 Talha Talib - 2018 Commonwealth Games Weightlifting Bronze Medal
 Muhammad Nooh Dastgir Butt - 2018 Commonwealth Games Weightlifting Bronze Medal
 Muhammad Bilal (wrestler) - 2018 Commonwealth Games Wrestling Bronze Medal

References

Gujranwala